Tokhirjon Muminov (born 6 August 1970) is a retired Tajikistani footballer, and current manager of Fayzkand.

Career

Managerial career
On 10 August 2012, Muminov ended his first stint as Khayr Vahdat manager.
On 31 October 2014, Muminov returned to Khayr Vahdat as manager.

In July 2016, Muminov replaced Rahmatullo Fuzailov as manager of CSKA Pamir Dushanbe.

On 14 March 2019, Muminov was appointed as manager of FK Istaravshan.

On 24 March 2020, Muminov was appointed as manager of FK Fayzkand.

Career statistics

International

Statistics accurate as of 11 September 2015.

International Goals

Own Goals for Senior National Team

References

1970 births
Living people
Soviet footballers
Tajikistani footballers
Tajikistani expatriate footballers
Tajikistan international footballers
Expatriate footballers in Uzbekistan
Tajikistani expatriate sportspeople in Uzbekistan
Tajikistani football managers
CSKA Pamir Dushanbe players
Vakhsh Qurghonteppa players
Footballers at the 1998 Asian Games
Association football midfielders
Asian Games competitors for Tajikistan